Johannes Adrianus Bernardus van Buitenen (21 May 1928 – 21 September 1979) was a Dutch Indologist at the University of Chicago where he was the George V. Bobrinskoy Professor of Sanskrit in the Department of South Asian Languages and Civilizations. He was one of the world's leading Sanskrit scholars. His interests ranged widely over literature, philosophy and philology, but toward the end of his career he focused primarily on the Mahābhārata.

Biography
Van Buitenen studied with Jan Gonda at the Rijksuniversiteit, Utrecht, Netherlands (since 1990 Universiteit Utrecht). He received his doctorate, cum laude, on 23 October 1953 and immediately departed for India where he stayed until 1956 as sub-editor of the " Dictionary of Sanskrit on Historical Principles" project at Deccan College, Poona . From 1959 to 1961 he was Reader in Indian philosophy at Utrecht but found he had little interest in the position or in staying in the Netherlands. As a consequence he happily accepted an invitation to take a position at the University of Chicago and remained there until his death in 1979 at the age of fifty-one. He was appointed associate professor in Sanskrit and Indic studies in 1959 and professor in linguistics in Oriental languages in 1964. After a South Asian languages and civilizations department was formed in 1966, he was chairman for 10 years.

Van Buitenen contributed to the training of several notable scholars in the USA, among them James L. Fitzgerald (Brown University), Walter O. Kaelber, Michael D. Willis, Bruce M. Sullivan (Northern Arizona University) and Bruce Lincoln (University of Chicago).

Van Buitenen was on the board of directors of the American Oriental Society  and  became a correspondent of the Royal Netherlands Academy of Arts and Sciences in 1963.

Amongst many publications he edited and translated the first five books of the Hindu epic, "The Mahabharata". They were published in three volumes by the University of Chicago Press. At the time of his death he was working on the fourth of seven volumes.

Publications

Books

Selected articles

References

External links
The University of Chicago
South Asian Language and Civilizations at The University of Chicago
Guide to the J. A. B. van Buitenen Papers 1946–1978 at the University of Chicago Special Collections Research Center 

1928 births
1979 deaths
Dutch Indologists
Dutch Sanskrit scholars
Utrecht University alumni
Academic staff of Utrecht University
University of Chicago faculty
Members of the Royal Netherlands Academy of Arts and Sciences
Writers from The Hague
Sanskrit–English translators
20th-century translators